The Bina River is a river that flows in Madhya Pradesh state of India. It is a chief tributary of the Betwa River, which is itself a tributary of the Yamuna River. The settlements of Bina Etawa, Eran Begamganj, Gairatganj and Rahatgarh are located on the banks of the Bina.

References 

Rivers of Madhya Pradesh
Tributaries of the Yamuna River